The fifteenth season of the American television series Whose Line Is It Anyway? premiered on The CW on June 17, 2019, and concluded on September 23, 2019.

Cast

Recurring  
 Jonathan Mangum (three episodes)
 Brad Sherwood (two episodes)
 Greg Proops (two episodes)
 Jeff Davis (two episodes)
 Chip Esten (one episode)
 Gary Anthony Williams (one episode)
 Heather Anne Campbell (one episode)

Following two one-off appearances in Seasons 13 and 14, Chip Esten recurred as a fourth performer for the first time since season eight.

Episodes 

"Winner(s)" of each episode as chosen by host Aisha Tyler are highlighted in italics. The winner(s) perform a sketch during the credit roll, just like in the original UK series.

References

External links
Whose Line Is It Anyway? (U.S.) (a Titles & Air Dates Guide)
Mark's guide to Whose Line is it Anyway? - Episode Guide

Whose Line Is It Anyway?
2019 American television seasons